Samuel Lee Wilkey (born 1938) is a former American football coach. He served as the head football coach at Sterling College in Sterling, Kansas for one season, in 1961, compiling a record of 1–8. Wilkey is a 1960 graduate of Sterling College in Sterling, Kansas, where he holds three letters in athletics.

Head coaching record

References

1938 births
Living people
Sterling Warriors football coaches
Sterling Warriors football players
Sterling Warriors men's basketball players